Brillouin could refer to:

 Marcel Brillouin (1854–1948), a French physicist
 His son Léon Brillouin (1889–1969), also a physicist, with dual French and US citizenships
 Things named after him:
 The Brillouin function, a function that describes the magnetization of an ideal paramagnet
 Brillouin scattering, the scattering of light by density variations in a material
 Brillouin zone, a primitive cell of the reciprocal lattice of a crystal